Alessano is a town and comune  in the province of Lecce, part of Apulia region of south-east Italy.

Main sights
Mother Church of San Salvatore (late 18th century)
Church of Sant'Antonio (late 16th-early 17th centuries)
Church of Chapuchins
Church of the Crucifix (1651)
Ducal Palace, a fortified noble residence built in the late 15th century

References 

Cities and towns in Apulia
Localities of Salento